Kronohagens Idrottsförening (abbreviated KIF or Kiffen) is a sports club from Helsinki, Finland. The club was founded on 27 September 1908, and has been mainly known for the achievements of its association football and handball teams.  In the past the club also played at the top level in ice hockey and has won the Kalevan malja (Kaleva Cup) in athletics. Other sports that the club participates include shooting, bandy, bowling, and boxing.

The men's football team is historically one of the most successful teams in Finland, and won the national football championship on three occasions during the 1910s, but currently plays in the Kakkonen (Second Division), the third tier of Finnish football.  The football section of Kronohagens Idrottsforening is now known as FC Kiffen 08.

Football

History

Kiffen football is known as the Mustat Hurmurit (Black charmers).  The name comes from the late 1920s when the black coloured jersey was first introduced bu Kiffen bandy team. Kiffen had two representatives, Ragnar Wickström and Lars Schybergson, in the Finnish football team at the Stockholm Olympics in 1912.  The club then won the Finnish football championship (Mestaruussarja) in 1913, 1915 and 1916 in the years prior to Finnish independence in 1917.  Kiffen’s last championship win came much later in 1955.

The decline in Kiffen football set in a decade later when the club were relegated from the Mestaruussarja and then a further relegation from the Suomensarja (Finland League), the second tier,  followed in 1965 to the Maakuntasarja, the third tier.  Fortunes fluctuated in the late 1960s and early 1970s before the club made its last appearances in the Mestaruussarja in 1977 and 1978. Among the players representing Kiffen at that time were Erkki Alaja, Juha Dahllund, Kai Haaskivi, Atik Ismail and Reima Kokko.

The following year in 1978 Kiffen had dropped to the Ykkönen (First Division) and in the subsequent years the club have not reached second tier football. Over the last 30 years the club has fluctuated between the Kakkonen (Second Division) and Kolmonen (Third Division).

In 1982 and 1983 Kiffen’s ladies team reached the Finnish Women’s league championship qualifiers and from 1984 until 1989 played in the Premier Division after which the team withdrew with their divisional place being inherited by MP Mikkeli.

Honours and achievements
 Finnish Champions (Mestaruussarja Winners): 1913, 1915, 1916 and 1955
 Finnish Cup (Suomen Cup): Runners–up in 1958 (2–4 to KTP Kotka).

Divisional movements since 1930
Top Level (25 seasons): 1930–32, 1940/41–46/47, 1948–57, 1960–64, 1977–78
Second Level (16 seasons): 1936–39, 1947/48, 195859, 1965, 1969–74, 1976, 1979
Third Level (21 seasons): 1975, 1980–85, 1990, 1994–2004, 2009–2012, 2015–

Season to season

25 seasons in Veikkausliiga
19 seasons in Ykkönen
29 seasons in Kakkonen
13 seasons in Kolmonen

Club structure
Kiffen runs 3 men's teams and 6 veteran's teams.

FC Kiffen are competing in Group A of the Kakkonen.  This is the third tier of the Finnish football system.  In 2020 the team finished in fifth position in their Kakkonen group.

FC Kiffen/3 are participating in the Section 1 of the Nelonen (Fourth Division).

FC Kiffen/3 are participating in the Section 3 of the Vitonen (Fifth Division).

Current squad

Management
As of 9 January 2021

Bandy
The club played bandy in its early years and was the runner-up for the Finnish championship five times between 1917 and 1932.

Ice hockey
Kiffen played under the name KIF in the Finnish SM-sarja for several occasions. KIF won the SM-sarja 3 times (1939, 1941 and 1943). KIF played its final SM-sarja season in 1952 and has not been playing top level ice hockey since.

Handball
Kiffen has one of the most successful Handball teams in Finland. Kiffen played in the Finnish Handball League from 1969 to 2003. Kiffen's best years were during the 1970s when they were 10 times in the medals.

References and sources
Official Club website
Official Football website
Finnish Wikipedia
 Suomen Cup

Footnotes

Bandy clubs in Finland
Football clubs in Helsinki
Association football clubs established in 1908
Bandy clubs established in 1908
1908 establishments in Finland